Timea Bacsinszky was the defending champion, but chose not to participate.

Irina-Camelia Begu won the tournament, defeating Kaia Kanepi in the final, 6–3, 6–4.

Seeds

Main draw

Finals

Top half

Bottom half

References 
 Main draw

Lorraine Open 88 - Singles